Soupeur is a sexual practice involving attraction to other male secretions, specifically bread soaked in urine, or semen.

Bread soaked in urine
This specific meaning refers to individuals who take pleasure in consuming food soaked in the urine of others, in particular bread abandoned and later retrieved at public urinals. This practice was popular in Paris and Marseille up until the 1960s and 1970s. There were numerous contemporary references in popular culture.

There existed an alternative where a public urinal is stopped in order to wait for it to fill. Then a person would enter it and submerge his penis into the urine of previous users. This was alternatively called dipping.

Semen in brothels
The term alternatively describes the act of individuals visiting brothels to consume the semen left on the prostitutes by the customers. This act is also named "do dinette."

In her autobiography One two two, former prostitute Fabienne Jamet evokes this practice: "Back when I ruled the 122, I had a soupeur who could take thirty to forty loads at a time."

Sometimes prostitutes "fake" their performance by brushing their pubic hair with ersatz sperm made from a mixture of egg white, urine and a few drops of bleach.

Mentions in popular culture

These practices both extreme and often adorned innocuous descriptions slums of Paris in the literature of the mid-twentieth century:

 "There were fairies still too green for the Bois... One of them came around every day, his specialty was the urinals and especially the crusts of bread soaking in the drains... He told us his adventures... He knew an old Jew who loved the stuff, a butcher on the rue des Archives... They'd go and eat it together... One day they got caught... " Louis-Ferdinand Celine, Death on Credit, 1936.
 "And I will not cause my old pervert funds bogeymen nor soupeurs ... I had nothing to complain about it. "Albert Simonin, Hands Off the Loot 1953.
 "Not far from the subway, two or three soupeurs were waiting" Auguste Le Breton, Raid on chnouf, 1954.
 "I know a soupeur ... one of those guys that put bread in public urinals ... which revert to eat urine-soaked" Silvio Fanti, Man micropsychoanalysis, 1981.
 "Some drunks, prostitutes, and even a soupeur" Joann Sfar, Pascin 2005.
 "I was twelve. [...] Martial, my boyfriend of Clos Street, had teamed up with a guy who lived Orteaux Street, just above the urinal where diners began to dip their piece of bread in piss. They put the whole loaves coming and resume the gentle evening. We had spotted them, we were naive, we did not realize they ate the bread swollen with urine. "Nan Aurousseau, District carrion, 2012 Stock p. 100.

References

Bibliography
 Brenda B. Love Dictionnaire des fantasmes et perversions, Éditions Blanche, 2000. 
 Fabienne Jamet One two two, éditions Olivier Orban, 1975.
 Laud Humphreys Le Commerce des pissotières, Pratiques anonymes dans l’Amérique des années 1960, La Découverte, 2005.
 Marc Lemonier et Alexandre Dupouy, Histoire(s) du Paris libertin, La Musardine, 2003.
 Robert Stoller La perversion, forme érotique de la haine, Payot, coll. "Petite Bibliothèque Payot", 2007, .
 Véronique Willemin, La Mondaine, histoire et archives de la Police des Mœurs, Hoëbeke, 2009.

Urine
Sexual fetishism